The Hordern-Richmond Autoplane was a 1930s British twin engined two seat cabin touring monoplane designed by Edmund Hordern, and constructed by Heston Aircraft Company Ltd.

Development
The Autoplane was designed by Edmund G. Hordern in collaboration with Frederick Duke of Richmond and Gordon, and built in 1936 by Heston Aircraft Company at Heston Aerodrome near London. The aircraft was planned to be manufactured and marketed by Hordern-Richmond Aircraft Ltd that was formed by the co-designers in April 1937.

Construction was primarily wooden, with plywood skinned frames. The wings were cantilever, and could be folded outboard of the engines. The fixed main undercarriage legs were inline with the engines, with no brakes and a simple tail skid. The Autoplane was fitted with a control system by which all manoeuvres could be carried out using one hand. At the top of each of the normal control columns there was a small wheel which took the place of the more usual rudder bar or pedals. No wing flaps or pilot-operated trimmers were provided.

Operational history
Registered G-AEOG, an Authorisation to Fly was issued on 16 October 1936, and the Autoplane was piloted by Edmund Hordern on its first flight at Heston Aerodrome on 28 October 1936. It was based at Goodwood airfield after flight testing at Heston. It was owned by the Duke of Richmond and Gordon until 14 April 1938, and then by Hordern-Richmond Aircraft Ltd at Denham Aerodrome. The aircraft's colour scheme is believed to be as follows: Fuselage, fin, rudder and nacelles dark blue, lettering G-AEOG with a white outline. Wings and stabiliser silver with dark blue lettering. It was grounded during World War II. Hordern-Richmond merged with Lang Propellers of Weybridge, and a new factory was built at Haddenham, near Thame, Buckinghamshire. The engineless remains of the Autoplane were stored in the roof of the Haddenham factory, but further details of its fate are not known.

Specifications

Notes

References
 Jackson, A.J. 1974. British Civil Aircraft Since 1919 Vol.3 , p. 255

1930s British civil utility aircraft
Low-wing aircraft
Aircraft first flown in 1936
Twin piston-engined tractor aircraft